Taewon Bang clan was one of the Korean clans. Their Bon-gwan was in Taiyuan, Shanxi, China. According to the research in 2000, the number of Taewon Bang clan was 52. Their founder was  who was a general in Ming dynasty, China and was naturalized in Joseon.

See also 
 Korean clan names of foreign origin

References

External links 
 

Korean clan names of Chinese origin